Fisherrow railway station served the harbour of Fisherrow, East Lothian, Scotland from 1831 to 1847 on the Edinburgh and Dalkeith Railway.

History 
The station opened in 1831 by the Edinburgh and Dalkeith Railway. To the south was a depot that was originally a coal store but later sold merchandise for Fisherrow Harbour. The station closed to passengers on 14 July 1847.

References

External links 

Disused railway stations in East Lothian
Former North British Railway stations
Railway stations in Great Britain opened in 1834
Railway stations in Great Britain closed in 1847
1834 establishments in Scotland
1961 disestablishments in Scotland